The Dr. O.B. Harriman House, also known as the Harriman Nielsen Historic Farm, is an historic structure located in Hampton, Iowa, United States.  The Italianate style house was built in 1881.  It was donated to the Franklin County Historical Society by the Nielsen Estate.  It is currently being restored.    The house has been listed on the National Register of Historic Places since 1987.

References

External links
 Franklin County Historical Society

Houses completed in 1881
Italianate architecture in Iowa
Hampton, Iowa
Houses on the National Register of Historic Places in Iowa
Museums in Franklin County, Iowa
Historic house museums in Iowa
National Register of Historic Places in Franklin County, Iowa
1881 establishments in Iowa